Mount Herr is a peak,  high, located  northwest of Mount Gould in the Tapley Mountains of Antarctica. It was named by the Advisory Committee on Antarctic Names after Lieutenant Arthur L. Herr, Jr., an aircraft commander with U.S. Navy Squadron VX-6 at McMurdo Station, 1962–63 and 1963–64.

References

Mountains of Marie Byrd Land